The Alabama red-bellied cooter (Pseudemys alabamensis) or Alabama red-bellied turtle, is native to Alabama. It belongs to the turtle family Emydidae, the pond turtles. It is the official reptile of the state of Alabama.

Life history
The red-belly inhabits the fresh to brackish waters of the Mobile-Tensaw River Delta in Mobile and Baldwin counties. It feeds on aquatic vegetation and can be found sunning itself on logs.
Nesting of the red-bellied turtle occurs from May through July. Female turtles lay their eggs on dry land, digging nests in sandy soil, where 4 to 9 eggs are laid. Hatchlings usually emerge during the summer. When the turtles nest in late July, hatchlings may overwinter in the nest and emerge the following spring.

A mature female can be , while a mature male can be .

Location
As of June 2009 the turtle has been seen in the central part of Alabama, in the Elmore County region.

This turtle has also been found in south-eastern Mississippi, in Harrison and Jackson counties.

Protection
In 2007, a  chain-link fence has been constructed along part of the US 98 causeway (Battleship Parkway) that separates the Mobile-Tensaw delta from Mobile Bay. Hatchling deaths dropped 80% from 2007 to 2008.

Gallery

References

External links

Save the Alabama Red-bellied turtle—Alabama red-bellied turtle alliance

Pseudemys
Endemic fauna of the United States
Reptiles described in 1893
ESA endangered species
Taxa named by Georg Baur
Reptiles of the United States
Symbols of Alabama